Magɨ is a moribund Papuan language of Madang Province, Papua New Guinea. It was discovered in 2012. It is spoken in the village of Wanang, which hosts a field site belonging to the New Guinea Binatang Research Center.

Magɨ is most closely related to the Aisi language, with which it forms an Aisian subgroup within the Sogeram branch.

Vocabulary
Below is a 100-item Swadesh list comparing Magɨ and Aisi, from Daniels (2016).

References

Sources
 Field research on the Magɨ language. Includes grammar descriptions and examples of words and sentences.

Sogeram languages
Languages of Madang Province